The 2022 Asian Netball Championships were held in Singapore between 3 September and 11 September 2022, with eleven teams taking part. The championships also served as qualifiers for the 2023 Netball World Cup.

The tournament had two group stages, with results from the first stage determining groups for the second. After the second round, teams were paired off within their group. For teams in the middle and lower groups of the second round, these play-offs determined final ranking. The two play-offs in the upper group were the tournament's semifinals, with the winners playing each other for the championship and the losers playing for third place.

Preliminary round

Group A

Group B

Group C

Group D

Second round

Group E

Group F

Group G

Playoffs

5th-10th place

Semi-finals

3rd/4th place

Final

Final placings

Broadcasters

Notes

References 

Asian Netball Championship
2022 in netball
Netball
Netball
International netball competitions hosted by Singapore
Netball
2023 Netball World Cup qualification